Edwin Reyes, MP  is a Gibraltarian politician and a MP in the Gibraltar Parliament for the Gibraltar Social Democrats (GSD).

Reyes was first elected to parliament during the 2007 Gibraltar general election after which he served as Minister for Culture and later Housing under the cabinet of Peter Caruana. Since the GDS was put into opposition following the 2011 election, Reyes has served as Shadow Minister and spokesman for education.

See also
 List of Gibraltarians
 Politics of Gibraltar

References

Living people
Gibraltar Social Democrats politicians
Government ministers of Gibraltar
Year of birth missing (living people)